Nicolae Firoiu (born 4 March 1939), commonly known as Nico Firoiu, is a Romanian former water polo player and coach. He competed in the 1960 and 1964 Summer Olympics.

After retiring as a player, he coached the national teams of Iran and Romania. In 1974 he moved permanently to West Germany. In November 1975, he became the national head coach, reforming the German water polo and leading his team to gold medal at the 1981 European Championships, bronze in the 1982 World Championships, bronze at the 1984 Olympic Games.

See also
 Germany men's Olympic water polo team records and statistics

References

External links
 

1939 births
Living people
Water polo players from Bucharest
Romanian male water polo players
Romanian water polo coaches
Olympic water polo players of Romania
Water polo players at the 1960 Summer Olympics
Water polo players at the 1964 Summer Olympics
Romanian expatriate sportspeople in Iran
Romanian expatriate sportspeople in Germany